Poetry Africa is an international poetry festival held annually in Durban, South Africa.

More than twenty poets, predominantly from South Africa and elsewhere on the African continent, participate in the 7- to 10-day Poetry Africa, an international poetry festival that is based mostly in Durban, South Africa, during the final quarter of the year. The festival's extensive programme includes theatre performances, readings, music and book-launches with a festival finale at BAT Centre. Day activities include seminars, workshops, open mic opportunities, and school visits.

Poetry Africa is organized by the Centre for Creative Arts which is a multi-disciplinary arts organisation within the Faculty of Human Sciences at the University of KwaZulu-Natal in Durban. From the CCA Mission statement:

The Centre fulfils a function as facilitator, promoter, networker, and capacity builder, and plays a vital role in bringing to fruition the artistic potential of the region. The CCA co-ordinates four annual festivals which are the foremost of their kind in the region; Time of the Writer, Poetry Africa, the Durban International Film Festival, and the JOMBA! Contemporary Dance Festival. The CCA is also involved in other projects and programmes.  These festivals reflect artistic integrity, are professionally produced, and receive excellent media coverage. All have strong international links that enhance intercultural artistic relationships with and within South Africa, the African continent, and the global community.  All activities have important development components that reach into communities that do not have access to top-level art practitioners such as those participating in our festivals. Schools and tertiary institutions are a particular focus; as are grass roots community arts organisations.

Over 300 poets and writers have attended the festival in its 15 editions, including:

 Chris Abani, 2002
 Didier Awadi, 2011
 Gabeba Baderoon, 2005
 Dennis Brutus, multiple years
 Sutardji Calzoum Bachri, 2004
 Gary Cummiskey, 2008
 Kwame Dawes, 2011
 Bob Holman, 2003
 Stanley Onjezani Kenani, 2007
 Werewere Liking, 2004
 Myroslav Laiuk, 2018
 Gcina Mhlope, multiple years
 Bantu Mwaura, 2008 (also for Poetry Africa at the World Social Forum, Kenya 2007)
 Pitika Ntuli, multiple years
 Lesego Rampolokeng, multiple years
 Mamta Sagar, 2005
 Benjamin Zephaniah, 2000, 2006

See also 
 List of South African writers
 List of South African poets
 South African poetry

References

External links 
Poetry Africa webpage
Poetry Africa Tour 2011
The Witness - Article on the 15th Poetry Africa 2011
Centre for Creative Arts (Organisers) website
KZN Literary Tourism - Article on Poetry Africa

 

Poetry festivals in South Africa
South African poetry
Festivals in Durban